The arthouse action genre is an emerging film genre in contemporary cinema that traces its roots back to Asian and European films. Characteristics of arthouse action films include stylized action, an arthouse atmosphere, and a disjointed, fragmented narrative with more complexity than the typical action flick. These come together to create a sense of "dreamy surrealism."

List of films

 The Wages of Fear (Henri-Georges Clouzot, 1953)
 Seven Samurai (Akira Kurosawa, 1954)
 Yojimbo (Akira Kurosawa, 1961)
 Sanjuro (Akira Kurosawa, 1962)
 Django (Sergio Corbucci, 1966)
Branded to Kill (Seijun Suzuki, 1967)
Point Blank (John Boorman, 1967)
On Her Majesty's Secret Service (Peter R. Hunt, 1969)
Trial of the Road (Aleksei German, 1971)
 Assault on Precinct 13 (John Carpenter, 1976)
 Sorcerer (William Friedkin, 1977) 
 The Exterminator (James Glickenhaus, 1980)
 Gloria (John Cassavetes, 1980)
 The Soldier (James Glickenhaus, 1982)
 Runaway Train (Andrei Konchalovsky, 1985)
 Batman (Tim Burton, 1989)
 The Killer (John Woo, 1989)
 El Mariachi (Robert Rodriguez, 1992)
 Léon: The Professional (Luc Besson, 1994)
 Pulp Fiction (Quentin Tarantino, 1994)
 Starship Troopers (Paul Verhoeven, 1997)
 Run Lola Run (Tom Tykwer, 1998)
 Ghost Dog: The Way of the Samurai (Jim Jarmusch, 1999)
The Bourne Identity (Doug Liman, 2002)
 Kill Bill: Volume 1 (Quentin Tarantino, 2003)
 Oldboy (Park Chan-wook, 2003)
Miami Vice (Michael Mann, 2006)
 Apocalypto (Mel Gibson, 2006)
The Hurt Locker (Kathryn Bigelow, 2008)
 Inception (Christopher Nolan, 2010)
 Drive (Nicolas Winding Refn, 2011) 
 Hanna (Joe Wright, 2011)
 Haywire (Steven Soderbergh, 2011)
 Looper (Rian Johnson, 2012)
 The Grandmaster (Wong Kar-Wai, 2013)
 Only God Forgives (Nicolas Winding Refn, 2013)
 Snowpiercer (Bong Joon-ho, 2013)
 The Northman (Robert Eggers, 2022)
 Everything Everywhere All at Once (Daniels, 2022)
 RRR (S. S. Rajamouli, 2022)

Notable directors
 Seijun Suzuki
 Akira Kurosawa
 Kathryn Bigelow
 James Glickenhaus
 Nicolas Winding Refn
 Steven Soderbergh
 Joe Wright
 Quentin Tarantino

See also
Social thriller
Cannon Films
Art film
Vulgar auteurism
Neo-noir
New Hollywood
Film noir
Midnight movie
Synthwave
Extreme cinema
French New Wave
Cinéma du look
Maximalist film
Minimalist film
Indiewood

References

External links
Batman 1989: The first arthouse superhero movie? – Film Stories
Is Inception the Last Real Big-Budget Art Film? on MovieWeb

Film genres
Action films
Film styles
1950s in film
1960s in film
1970s in film
1980s in film
1990s in film
2000s in film
2010s in film
2020s in film
Postmodern art